The Indo-Pacific is a vast biogeographic region of Earth.

In a narrow sense, sometimes known as the Indo-West Pacific or Indo-Pacific Asia, it comprises the tropical waters of the Indian Ocean, the western and central Pacific Ocean, and the seas connecting the two. It does not include the temperate and polar regions of the Indian and Pacific oceans, nor the Tropical Eastern Pacific, along the Pacific coast of the Americas, which is also a distinct marine realm. The term is especially useful in marine biology, ichthyology, and similar fields, since many marine habitats are continuously connected from Madagascar to Japan and Oceania, and a number of species occur over that range, but are not found in the Atlantic Ocean.

The region has an exceptionally high species richness, with the world's highest species richness being found in at its heart in the Coral Triangle, and a remarkable gradient of decreasing species richness radiating outward in all directions. The region includes over 3,000 species of fish, compared with around 1,200 in the next richest marine region, the Western Atlantic, and around 500 species of reef building corals, compared with about 50 species in the Western Atlantic. 

The term first appeared in academic use in oceanography and geopolitics. Scholarship has shown that the "Indo-Pacific" concept circulated in Weimar Germany, and spread to interwar Japan. German political oceanographers envisioned an "Indo-Pacific" comprising anticolonial India and republican China, as German allies, against "Euro-America". Since the late 2010s, the term "Indo-Pacific" has been increasingly used in geopolitical discourse. It also has a "symbiotic link" with the Quadrilateral Security Dialogue, or "Quad", an informal grouping between Australia, Japan, India, and the United States. It has been argued that the concept may lead to a change in popular "mental maps" of how the world is understood in strategic terms.

In its widest sense, the term geopolitically covers all nations and islands surrounding either the Indian Ocean or the Pacific Ocean, encompassing mainland African and Asian nations who border these oceans, such as India and South Africa, Indian Ocean territories such as the Kerguelen Islands and Seychelles, the Malay Archipelago (which is within the bounds of both the Indian Ocean and the Pacific), Japan, Russia and other Far East nations bordering the Pacific, Australia and all the Pacific Islands east of them, as well as Pacific nations of the Americas such as Canada or Mexico. ASEAN countries (defined as those in Southeast Asia and the Malay Archipelago) are considered to be geographically at the centre of the political Indo-Pacific.

Subdivisions

The WWF and Nature Conservancy divide the Indo-Pacific into 3 realms (or subrealms), and each of these into 25 marine provinces and 77 ecoregions (Marine Ecoregions of the World; MEOW) based on data-driven expert opinion. Other schemes for subdivision of the Indo-Pacific have included: 5 provinces, based on endemism in fishes; 3 regions split into 10 provinces based on dissimilarity of fish assemblages, 11 provinces based on range boundaries in corals, 12 divisions split into 124 ecoregions based on biogeographic clustering from coral distributions and finally 8 realms from distributions of 65,000 marine species. All but the last of these schemes were tested against one another by an international consortium of marine scientists using genetic data from 56 Indo-Pacific species, with the reasoning that genetic data should reflect the evolutionary processes that structure the Indo-Pacific. While there was no clear winning scheme, and all schemes were supported by data from at least one species, the genetic data in general favored schemes with few subdivisions, supporting the Indo-Pacific as relatively unstructured biogeographic realm - possibly the world's largest. Below are briefly described the 3 MEOW realms of the Indo-Pacific:

Central Indo-Pacific

The Central Indo-Pacific includes the numerous seas and straits connecting the Indian and Pacific oceans, including the seas surrounding the Indonesian archipelago (with the exception of Sumatra's northwest coast, which is part of the Western Indo-Pacific), the South China Sea, the Philippine Sea, the north coast of Australia, and the seas surrounding New Guinea, western and central Micronesia, New Caledonia, the Solomon Islands, Vanuatu, Fiji, and Tonga. The Central Indo-Pacific, due in part to its central location at the meeting of two oceans, has the greatest richness and diversity of marine organisms, specifically located within the Coral Triangle, which contains 76% of all known coral species in the world.

Eastern Indo-Pacific

The Eastern Indo-Pacific surrounds the mostly volcanic islands of the central Pacific Ocean, extending from the Marshall Islands in the west through central and southeastern Polynesia to Hawaii, to the west coast of Chile. The World Wide Fund for Nature believe the region ends at Chile's Easter Island and Isla Salas y Gómez, although it is sometimes extended even further to include Chile's Desventuradas Islands and Juan Fernández Islands.

Western Indo-Pacific

The Western Indo-Pacific covers the western and central portion of the Indian Ocean, including Africa's east coast, the Red Sea, the Gulf of Aden, the Persian Gulf, the Arabian Sea, the Bay of Bengal, and the Andaman Sea, as well as the coastal waters surrounding Madagascar, Seychelles, the Comoros, the Mascarene Islands, Maldives, and the Chagos Archipelago.

Ecology
Some seashore and coastal plants are found throughout most of the region, including the trees Pisonia grandis, Calophyllum inophyllum, Heliotropium arboreum, Pandanus tectorius, Cordia subcordata, Guettarda speciosa, and the shrubs Scaevola taccada, Suriana maritima, and Pemphis acidula. These plants have adapted to grow on coral sand, and have seeds adapted to crossing salt water, including distribution by birds or which can survive floating in salt water.

The trees coconut (Coco nucifera), candlenut (Aleurites moluccanus), and Morinda citrifolia originated in the Central Indo-Pacific, and were spread further across the region by human settlers.

Economic region 
The "Indo-Pacific" has been an economic idea since its early formulation in Weimar Germany. According to Hansong Li, the German geographer Karl Haushofer, son of the economist Max Haushofer, believed that capital, along with urbanisation and population growth, are key vectors that determine the 'manometers' of the oceanic region. Haushofer also explained why industrialisation broke out in Europe rather than the Indo-Pacific by a spatial theory of demography.

In the 21st century, with the rising involvement of the United States in the new growth areas of Asia, the idea of the Indo-Pacific Economic Corridor (IPEC) emerged during the U.S.–India Strategic Dialogue of 2013. The Secretary of State John Kerry referred to the potential of the Indo-Pacific Economic Corridor in transforming the prospects for development and investments as well as for trade and transit between the economies of South and Southeast Asia Indo-Pacific economic corridor.

K. Yhome in his scholarly study has mapped out the potential for various emerging trans-regional corridors in Asia along with the challenges of linking IPEC into the larger web of regional economic integration initiatives taking shape in the region in 2017.

On 23 May 2022, the president of the United States, Joe Biden, launched the Indo-Pacific Economic Framework for Prosperity (IPEF). This agreement includes a dozen of initial partners including: Australia, Brunei, India, Indonesia, Japan, Republic of Korea, Malaysia, New Zealand, the Philippines, Singapore, Thailand, and Vietnam. Together, all the countries included within the framework represent 40% of the world GDP. The IPEF contains four pillars:
Connected Economy: through digital economy rules, data localization, AI, privacy.
Resilient Economy: through better supply chain commitments that better anticipate and prevent disruptions in supply chains.
Clean Economy: with commitments to clean energy, decarbonization, and green infrastructure.
Fair Economy: with recommendation to strengthen efforts to crack down on corruption, effective tax implementation, anti-money laundering, and anti-bribery regimes.

Geopolitical context

Origins 
The German geopolitician Karl Haushofer first used "Indo-Pacific" in the 1920s in multiple works on geography and geopolitics: Geopolitics of the Pacific Ocean (1924), Building Blocks of Geopolitics (1928), Geopolitics of Pan-Ideas (1931), and German Cultural Politics in the Indo-Pacific Space (1939). Haushofer legitimated the integration of the two oceans by evidence in marine biology, oceanography, ethnography, and historical philology. He envisioned an "Indo-Pacific" comprising anticolonial forces in India and China, as Germany's ally against the maritime domination of Britain, the United States, and Western Europe.

Contemporary use 
The Japanese Prime Minister Shinzō Abe referred to the "confluence" of the Indian and Pacific Oceans in his speech to the Indian Parliament in August 2007 as "the dynamic coupling as seas of freedom and of prosperity" in the "broader Asia". The focus of Japanese Prime Minister's August 2007 speech in the Indian Parliament was on security of sea lanes linking the two oceans. In the academic discourse relating to such maritime security issue in the Indo-Pacific, the first articulation was carried by a paper published in January 2007 by the Institute of Defense Studies and Analyses (IDSA), New Delhi. It was a result of consultations between IDSA and the Japan Institute of International Affairs (JIIA) held in New Delhi in October 2006. From 2010 onwards, the term Indo-Pacific acquired salience within the Indian government and has since been used often by India's apex political leadership. From about 2011 onwards, the term has been used frequently by strategic analysts and high-level government/military leadership in Australia, Japan and the United States to denote said region. However, a formal/official documented articulation of the term first appeared in Australia's Defence White Paper, 2013. It is also "symbiotically linked" with the Quadrilateral Security Dialogue—an informal grouping of like-minded democracies in the region, comprising Australia, India, Japan, and the United States.

Since 2011, the term "Indo-Pacific" is being used increasingly in geopolitical discourse.

In 2013, Indonesian Foreign Minister Marty Natalegawa proposed an "Indo-Pacific Treaty of Friendship and Cooperation" to restore trust, manage unresolved territory disputes, and help countries deal with change in the region. In 2013, U.S. officials have begun using the term "Indo-Asia Pacific". 

In 2019, the United States Department of State published a document formalizing the concept of a "Free and Open Indo-Pacific", to be sustained among members of "the Quad", a partnership of four Indo-Pacific democracies led by the United States, in concert with Australia, India, and Japan. "Indo-Pacific" has also featured prominently in top-level U.S. strategic documents such as the 2017 National Security Strategy, the 2018 Nuclear Posture Review, and the 2018 National Defense Strategy. According to Felix Heiduk and Gudrun Wacker at the German Institute for International and Security Affairs, the concept is aimed at containing China and is "primarily understood as a U.S.-led containment strategy directed against China" in Beijing. It has been argued that the concept of the Indo-Pacific may lead to a change in popular "mental maps" of how the world is understood in strategic terms. 

The term's profile was raised when it found mention in the joint statement issued by the Indian Prime Minister Narendra Modi and United States President Donald Trump after the former's state visit to the White House on 26 June 2017. "As responsible stewards in the Indo-Pacific region, President Trump and Prime Minister Modi agreed that a close partnership between the United States and India is central to peace and stability in the region. In marking 70 years of diplomatic relations between India and the United States, the leaders resolved to expand and deepen the strategic partnership between the countries and advance common objectives. Above all, these objectives include combatting terrorist threats, promoting stability across the Indo-Pacific region, increasing free and fair trade, and strengthening energy linkages". However, President Trump's November 2017 articulation on Indo-Pacific was widely seen as something that would usher in a new (US–China) Cold War. This led to the Indian Prime Minister spelling out the Indian vision of Indo-Pacific as an enabler for "a common pursuit of progress and prosperity... not directed against any country... (albeit based on) our principled commitment to rule of law". According to Dr. Cenk Tamer, the U.S. seeks to create an "anti-China axis" in the Asia-Pacific region through the conceptualization of the Indo-Pacific because it sees India as a key part in containing China. This was reiterated by President Biden, who declared a "secure and prosperous Indo-Pacific." Tamer calls the Indo-Pacific a concept that started to gain ground in international relations as a geopolitical challenge by the U.S. toward China.

Criticism 
The Australian Citizens Party, a minor third party associated with the LaRouche movement, criticises the "Indo-Pacific" vision as a reenactment of Nazi strategy, given the concept's link to Karl Haushofer. 

Former Prime Minister of Australia Paul Keating, in a televised address at the National Press Club, criticised the notion of the "Indo-Pacific" as a construct of the United States in its diplomatic war with China:

See also 

 AUKUS
 Asia-Pacific
 Austronesian peoples
 East of Suez
 Orient
 Valeriepieris circle
 Geography of Asia
 United States Indo-Pacific Command

References

Further reading

 
  excerpt
  excerpt
 J. Cannon, Brendon; Rossiter, Ash, eds. (August 2018). Rising Powers Quarterly. 3 (2). special issue on "The "Indo-Pacific" – Regional Dynamics in the 21st Century's New Geopolitical Center of Gravity"
 2018 United States Strategic Framework for the Indo-Pacific

Marine realms
Oceans
Indian Ocean
Pacific Ocean